Natchathiram is a 1980 Indian Tamil-language film directed by Dasari Narayana Rao and starring Sripriya in the lead role. It is a remake of the 1978 Telugu film Sivaranjani. The film also has Mohan Babu as a cunning husband of Sripriya. Sivaji Ganesan, Kamal Haasan, Rajinikanth, Savithri, K. R. Vijaya, Manjula Vijayakumar, Srividya and Pushpalatha played guest roles.

Plot

Cast 
Sripriya
Mohan Babu
Hariprasath
Sivachandran
Manorama
Jayamalini
Sivaji Ganesan in Guest Appearance
Kamal Haasan in Guest Appearance
Rajinikanth in Guest Appearance
Nagesh in Guest Appearance
Prabha in Guest Appearance
Savitri in Guest Appearance
Radha in Guest Appearance
K. R. Vijaya in Guest Appearance
Manjula in Guest Appearance
Srividya in Guest Appearance
Pushpalatha in Guest Appearance

Soundtrack 
The soundtrack was composed by Shankar–Ganesh.

References

External links 
 

1980 films
1980s Tamil-language films
Films about filmmaking
Films directed by Dasari Narayana Rao
Films scored by Shankar–Ganesh
Tamil remakes of Telugu films